The March 871 was a Formula One racing car designed by the March Racing Team and driven in the 1987 Formula One season. The car was powered by a Cosworth DFZ V8 engine, and was driven by the 1986 International Formula 3000 champion, Italian Ivan Capelli.

Background and competitive history 
The team was sponsored by Japanese real estate company Leyton House.

The 871 chassis was not ready for the first race in Brazil. So the team used an F3000/F1 hybrid called the March 87P. The 871 was ready for the second race in San Marino.

The best result and the only points were achieved with a 6th place at the 1987 Monaco Grand Prix. However Capelli and the March 871 did finish 4th in the Colin Chapman Trophy for constructors of cars equipped with naturally aspirated engines.

Complete Formula One results
(key)

Colin Chapman Trophy (for constructors of cars equipped with naturally aspirated engines)
(key)

References

1987 Formula One season cars
March Formula One cars